"Run for Cover" is a song by American rock band the Killers from their fifth studio album, Wonderful Wonderful (2017). Originally released as a promotional single on July 28, 2017, the song was sent to alternative radio in the United States on November 14, 2017, serving as the album's second single.

Background and release
The Killers' vocalist Brandon Flowers revealed that "Run for Cover" was originally written for their 2008 album Day & Age, but it was not completed due to Flowers not being able to finish the second verse of the song at the time. After meeting with Australian musician Alex Cameron in Las Vegas, he finally had a breakthrough as they kept on working together until the verse was finished. In the beginning of 2017, Flowers revealed the song had a good shot of being featured on the band's album. The Killers debuted "Run for Cover" during a concert at Borgata in Atlantic City on June 10, 2017. On July 28, the song was released as a promotional single from Wonderful Wonderful.

Composition and lyrical interpretation
"Run for Cover" has been characterized under the genres new wave, post-punk revival, pop rock, heartland rock, and synth-pop, and was written by Flowers, Mark Stoermer, Ronnie Vannucci Jr., Alex Cameron, Jacknife Lee, and Stuart Price. Although it was initially produced by the latter, the track's production was finished by Lee. The song also contains an interpolation of Bob Marley's "Redemption Song". Lyrically, the song talks about domestic violence as Flowers tells a woman to "run for cover" from her abusive husband while she still can.

Critical reception
The song received critical acclaim from music critics. Andrew Trendell from NME described it as a "synth-pop banger driven by post-punk propulsion" and noted the similarity in sound to that of Sam's Town. Rolling Stones Daniel Kreps called it a "glossy, buoyant track that proves the band hasn't strayed from their textbook sound." The Musical Hype! gave the song four out of five stars and said: "All in all, 'Run for Cover' is a well-rounded, energetic, and up-tempo record from The Killers. Does it trump 'The Man'? It depends upon who you ask, but true to the band's style, this is next-level. Elite? Yes."

Music video
The music video for "Run for Cover" was directed by Tarik Mikou and released on August 22, 2017. The video tells the story of a woman who tries to run away from her ex-lover, backing up the recurring abusive relationship theme of the song's lyrics. After getting hit by him with a car, she gets up and sets the vehicle on fire with him inside. The cassette tape she is holding onto in the video reads "07/28/17", referring to the release date of the single.

Track listing
Digital download – remix
"Run for Cover" (Naderi remix) – 4:15

Credits and personnel
Credits adapted from the liner notes of Wonderful Wonderful.

Recording
 Recorded at 11th Street Records (Las Vegas, Nevada), The Garage (Topanga, California), and Battle Born Studios (Las Vegas, Nevada)
 Mastered at Metropolis (London)

Personnel
The Killers
 Brandon Flowers – vocals, keys
 Mark Stoermer – bass
 Ronnie Vannucci Jr. – drums

Additional personnel
 Jacknife Lee – production, engineering, guitar, keys, programming
 Matt Bishop – engineering
 Robert Root – engineering
 Malcolm Harrison – engineering assistance
 Ariel Rechtshaid – mixing
 Shawn Everett – mixing
 John Davis – mastering

Charts

Weekly charts

Year-end charts

Release history

Notes

References

2017 singles
2017 songs
American pop rock songs
American synth-pop songs
Island Records singles
The Killers songs
Song recordings produced by Jacknife Lee
Songs about domestic violence
Songs written by Bob Marley
Songs written by Brandon Flowers
Songs written by Jacknife Lee
Songs written by Mark Stoermer
Songs written by Ronnie Vannucci Jr.
Songs written by Stuart Price